This Old House is an American home improvement media brand with television shows, a magazine and a website, ThisOldHouse.com. The brand is headquartered in Stamford, CT. The television series airs on the American television station Public Broadcasting Service (PBS) and follows remodeling projects of houses over a number of weeks.

<onlyinclude>

Note: Episodes are listed in the original broadcast order

Season 11 (1989-1990)
Starring with this season, This Old House introduced a new host Steve Thomas. He was the author of several books, and the host of the PBS series Adventure.

Season 12 (1990–91)
Steve Thomas's second season as host.

Season 13 (1991–92)

Steve Thomas's third season as the host.

Season 14 (1992)
Steve Thomas's fourth season as the host.

Season 15 (1993–94)
Steve Thomas's fifth season as the host.

Season 16 (1994–95)
Steve Thomas's sixth season as the host.

Season 17 (1995–96)
Steve Thomas's seventh season as the host.

Season 18 (1996–97)
Steve Thomas's eighth season as the host.

Season 19 (1997–98)
Steve Thomas's ninth season as the host.
Starting with this season, This Old House goes on the internet, launching This Old House Online. This was done because PBS launched the official This Old House website.

Season 20 (1998–99)
Steve Thomas's tenth season as the host, and This Old House celebrates its 20th anniversary.
WGBH launched the This Old House website, which is www.thisoldhouse.org.

References

External links

This Old House at cptv.org

This Old House